An insulin analog (also called an insulin analogue) is any of several types of medical insulin that are altered forms of the hormone insulin, different from any occurring in nature, but still available to the human body for performing the same action as human insulin in terms of controlling blood glucose levels in diabetes. Through genetic engineering of the underlying DNA, the amino acid sequence of insulin can be changed to alter its ADME (absorption, distribution, metabolism, and excretion) characteristics.  Officially, the U.S. Food and Drug Administration (FDA) refers to these agents as insulin receptor ligands (because, like insulin itself, they are ligands of the insulin receptor), although they are usually just referred to as insulin analogs or even (loosely but commonly) just insulin (without further specification).

These modifications have been used to create two types of insulin analogs: those that are more readily absorbed from the injection site and therefore act faster than natural insulin injected subcutaneously, intended to supply the bolus level of insulin needed at mealtime (prandial insulin); and those that are released slowly over a period of between 8 and 24 hours, intended to supply the basal level of insulin during the day and particularly at nighttime (basal insulin). The first insulin analog (insulin Lispro rDNA) was approved for human therapy in 1996 and was manufactured by Eli Lilly and Company.

Fast acting

Lispro

Eli Lilly and Company developed and marketed the first rapid-acting insulin analogue (insulin lispro rDNA) Humalog. It was engineered through recombinant DNA technology so that the penultimate lysine and proline residues on the C-terminal end of the B-chain were reversed. This modification did not alter the insulin receptor binding, but blocked the formation of insulin dimers and hexamers. This allowed larger amounts of active monomeric insulin to be available for postprandial (after meal) injections.

Aspart

Novo Nordisk created "aspart" and marketed it as NovoLog/NovoRapid (UK-CAN) as a rapid-acting insulin analogue. It was created through recombinant DNA technology so that the amino acid, B28, which is normally proline, is substituted with an aspartic acid residue. The sequence was inserted into the yeast genome, and the yeast expressed the insulin analogue, which was then harvested from a bioreactor. This analogue also prevents the formation of hexamers, to create a faster acting insulin.  It is approved for use in CSII pumps and Flexpen, Novopen delivery devices for subcutaneous injection.

Glulisine

Glulisine is rapid acting insulin analog from Sanofi-Aventis, approved for use with a regular syringe, in an insulin pump.  Standard syringe delivery is also an option. It is sold under the name Apidra. The FDA-approved label states that it differs from regular human insulin by its rapid onset and shorter duration of action.

Long acting

Detemir insulin

Novo Nordisk created insulin detemir and markets it under the trade name Levemir as a long-lasting insulin analogue for maintaining the basal level of insulin. The basal level of insulin may be maintained for up to 20 hours, but the time is affected by the size of the injected dose.
This insulin has a high affinity for serum albumin, increasing its duration of action.

Degludec insulin

This is an ultralong-acting insulin analogue developed by Novo Nordisk, which markets it under the brand name Tresiba. It is administered once daily and has a duration of action that lasts up to 40 hours (compared to 18 to 26 hours provided by other marketed long-acting insulins such as insulin glargine and insulin detemir).

Glargine insulin

Sanofi-Aventis developed glargine as a longer-lasting insulin analogue, and sells it under the brand name Lantus. It was created by modifying three amino acids. Two positively charged arginine molecules were added to the C-terminus of the B-chain, and they shift the isoelectric point from 5.4 to 6.7, making glargine more soluble at a slightly acidic pH and less soluble at a physiological pH. Replacing the acid-sensitive asparagine at position 21 in the A-chain by glycine is needed to avoid deamination and dimerization of the arginine residue. These three structural changes and formulation with zinc result in a prolonged action when compared with biosynthetic human insulin. When the pH 4.0 solution is injected, most of the material precipitates and is not bioavailable. A small amount is immediately available for use, and the remainder is sequestered in subcutaneous tissue. As the glargine is used, small amounts of the precipitated material will move into solution in the bloodstream, and the basal level of insulin will be maintained up to 24 hours. The onset of action of subcutaneous insulin glargine is somewhat slower than NPH human insulin. It is clear solution as there is no zinc in formula. The biosimilar insulin glargine-yfgn (Semglee) was approved for medical use in the United States in July 2021, and in the European Union in March 2018.

Comparison with other insulins

NPH

NPH (Neutral Protamine Hagedorn) insulin is an intermediate-acting insulin with delayed absorption after subcutaneous injection, used for basal insulin support in diabetes type 1 and type 2. NPH insulins are suspensions that require shaking for reconstitution prior to injection. Many people reported problems when being switched to intermediate acting insulins in the 1980s, using NPH formulations of porcine/bovine insulins. Basal insulin analogs were subsequently developed and introduced into clinical practice to achieve more predictable absorption profiles and clinical efficacy.

Animal insulin

The amino acid sequence of animal insulins in different mammals may be similar to human insulin (insulin human INN), there is however considerable viability within vertebrate species. Porcine insulin has only a single amino acid variation from the human variety, and bovine insulin varies by three amino acids. Both are active on the human receptor with approximately the same strength. Bovine insulin and porcine insulin may be considered as the first clinically used insulin analogs (naturally occurring, produced by extraction from animal pancreas), at the time when biosynthetic human insulin (insulin human rDNA) was not available. There are extensive reviews on structure-relationship of naturally occurring insulins (phylogenic relationship in animals) and structural modifications. Prior to the introduction of biosynthetic human insulin, insulin derived from sharks was widely used in Japan.  Insulin from some species of fish may be also effective in humans.  Non-human insulins have caused allergic reactions in some patients related to the extent of purification, formation of non-neutralising antibodies is rarely observed with recombinant human insulin (insulin human rDNA) but allergy may occur in some patients.  This may be enhanced by the preservatives used in insulin preparations, or occur as a reaction to the preservative.  Biosynthetic insulin (insulin human rDNA) has largely replaced animal insulin.

Modifications
Before biosynthetic human recombinant analogues were available, porcine insulin was chemically converted into human insulin. Chemical modifications of the amino acid side chains at the N-terminus and/or the C-terminus were made in order to alter the ADME characteristics of the analogue. Semisynthetic insulins were clinically used for some time based on chemical modification of animal insulins, for example Novo Nordisk enzymatically converted porcine insulin into semisynthetic 'human' insulin by removing the single amino acid that varies from the human variety, and chemically adding the human amino acid.

Normal unmodified insulin is soluble at physiological pH. Analogues have been created that have a shifted isoelectric point so that they exist in a solubility equilibrium in which most precipitates out but slowly dissolves in the bloodstream and is eventually excreted by the kidneys.  These insulin analogues are used to replace the basal level of insulin, and may be effective over a period of up to 24 hours.  However, some insulin analogues, such as insulin detemir, bind to albumin rather than fat like earlier insulin varieties, and results from long-term usage (e.g. more than 10 years) are currently not available but required for assessment of clinical benefit.

Unmodified human and porcine insulins tend to complex with zinc in the blood, forming hexamers. Insulin in the form of a hexamer will not bind to its receptors, so the hexamer has to slowly equilibrate back into its monomers to be biologically useful.  Hexameric insulin delivered subcutaneously is not readily available for the body when insulin is needed in larger doses, such as after a meal (although this is more a function of subcutaneously administered insulin, as intravenously dosed insulin is distributed rapidly to the cell receptors, and therefore, avoids this problem).  Zinc combinations of insulin are used for slow release of basal insulin. Basal insulin support is required throughout the day representing about 50% of daily insulin requirement, the insulin amount needed at mealtime makes up for the remaining 50%. Non hexameric insulins (monomeric insulins) were developed to be faster acting and to replace the injection of normal unmodified insulin before a meal. There are phylogenetic examples for such monomeric insulins in animals.

Carcinogenicity
All insulin analogs must be tested for carcinogenicity, as insulin engages in cross-talk with IGF pathways, which can cause abnormal cell growth and tumorigenesis.  Modifications to insulin always carry the risk of unintentionally enhancing IGF signalling in addition to the desired pharmacological properties. There has been concern with the mitogenic activity and the potential for carcinogenicity of glargine. Several epidemiological studies have been performed to address these issues. Recent study result of the 6.5 years Origin study with glargine have been published.

Research on safety, efficacy, and comparative effectiveness

A meta-analysis completed in 2007 and updated in 2020 of numerous randomized controlled trials by the international Cochrane Collaboration found that the effects on blood glucose and glycated haemoglobin A1c (HbA1c) were comparable, treatment with glargine and detemir resulted in fewer cases of hypoglycemia when compared to NPH insulin.   Treatment with detrimir also reduced the frequency of serious hypoglycemia.  This review did note limitations, such as low glucose and HbA1c targets, that could limit the applicability of these findings to daily clinical practice.

In 2007, Germany's Institute for Quality and Cost Effectiveness in the Health Care Sector (IQWiG) report, concluded that there is currently "no evidence" available of the superiority of rapid-acting insulin analogs over synthetic human insulins in the treatment of adult patients with type 1 diabetes.  Many of the studies reviewed by IQWiG were either too small to be considered statistically reliable and, perhaps most significantly, none of the studies included in their widespread review were blinded, the gold-standard methodology for conducting clinical research.  However, IQWiG's terms of reference explicitly disregard any issues which cannot be tested in double-blind studies, for example a comparison of radically different treatment regimes.  IQWiG is regarded with skepticism by some doctors in Germany, being seen merely as a mechanism to reduce costs.  But the lack of study blinding does increase the risk of bias in these studies. The reason this is important is because patients, if they know they are using a different type of insulin, might behave differently (such as testing blood glucose levels more frequently, for example), which leads to bias in the study results, rendering the results inapplicable to the diabetes population at large.  Numerous studies have concluded that any increase in testing of blood glucose levels is likely to yield improvements in glycemic control, which raises questions as to whether any improvements observed in the clinical trials for insulin analogues were the result of more frequent testing or due to the drug undergoing trials.

In 2008, the Canadian Agency for Drugs and Technologies in Health (CADTH) found, in its comparison of the effects of insulin analogues and biosynthetic human insulin, that insulin analogues failed to show any clinically relevant differences, both in terms of glycemic control and adverse reaction profile.

Timeline
 1922 Banting and Best use bovine insulin extract on human
 1923 Eli Lilly and Company (Lilly) produces commercial quantities of bovine insulin
 1923 Hagedorn founds the Nordisk Insulinlaboratorium in Denmark forerunner of Novo Nordisk
 1926 Nordisk receives Danish charter to produce insulin as a non-profit
 1936 Canadians D.M. Scott and A.M. Fisher formulate zinc insulin mixture and license to Novo
 1936 Hagedorn discovers that adding protamine to insulin prolongs the effect of insulin
 1946 Nordisk formulates Isophane porcine insulin a.k.a. Neutral Protamine Hagedorn or NPH insulin
 1946 Nordisk crystallizes a protamine and insulin mixture
 1950 Nordisk markets NPH insulin
 1953 Novo formulates Lente porcine and bovine insulins by adding zinc for longer-lasting insulin
 1978 Genentech develop biosynthesis of recombinant human insulin in Escherichia coli bacteria using recombinant DNA technology
 1981 Novo Nordisk chemically and enzymatically converts porcine insulin to 'human' insulin (Actrapid HM)
 1982 Genentech synthetic 'human' insulin approved, in partnership with Eli Lilly and Company, who shepherded the product through the U.S. Food and Drug Administration (FDA) approval process
 1983 Lilly produces biosynthetic recombinant "rDNA insulin human INN" (Humulin)
 1985 Axel Ullrich sequences the human insulin receptor
 1988 Novo Nordisk produces synthetic, recombinant insulin ("insulin human INN")
 1996 Lilly Humalog "insulin lispro INN" approved by the U.S. Food and Drug Administration
 2003 Aventis Lantus "glargine" insulin analogue approved in USA 
 2004 Sanofi Aventis Apidra insulin "glulisine" analogue approved in the USA.
 2006 Novo Nordisk's Levemir "insulin detemir INN" analogue approved in the USA-
 2013 Novo Nordisk's Tresiba "insulin degludec INN" analogue approved in Europe (EMA with additional monitoring]

References

External links
 Analog Insulin
 

Insulin therapies
Eli Lilly and Company brands
Diabetes
Human proteins
Recombinant proteins
Peptide hormones